Heather Masse is an American alto singer and member of the Canadian folk trio The Wailin' Jennys. She was born and grew up in Maine, and studied at the New England Conservatory of Music as a jazz singer. She is currently based in Taos, New Mexico.

Masse joined The Wailin' Jennys in 2007. She released her first solo album, Bird Song, in 2009. She appeared regularly on the American Public Media program, A Prairie Home Companion, and is also a featured vocalist on the 2010 album Found Alive by Noam Weinstein. In 2016, she collaborated with trombonist Roswell Rudd on the album August Love Song.

Discography
 Bird Song (Red House, 2009)
 The Words Project (New Amsterdam, 2010)
 Lock My Heart (Red House, 2013)
 August Love Song (Red House, 2016)
 Hold On with Jed Wilson (CD Baby, 2019)

References

External links 
Official website

American women jazz singers
American jazz singers
Singers from Maine
Living people
New England Conservatory alumni
21st-century American singers
21st-century American women singers
The Wailin' Jennys members
1982 births